is a Japanese athlete specialising in the javelin throw. She represented her country at the 2019 World Championships without qualifying for the final. Earlier in her career she won a bronze medal at the 2011 Asian Championships.

Her personal best in the event is 62.88 metres set in Fukuoka in 2019.

International competitions

References

1992 births
Living people
Sportspeople from Osaka Prefecture
Japanese female javelin throwers
World Athletics Championships athletes for Japan
Japan Championships in Athletics winners
21st-century Japanese women